Semionellus is a genus of flat-backed millipedes in the family Xystodesmidae. There are at least three described species in Semionellus.

Species
These three species belong to the genus Semionellus:
 Semionellus michiganus (Chamberlin, 1946)
 Semionellus placidus (Wood, 1864)
 Semionellus tertius Chamberlin, 1948

References

Further reading

 
 

Polydesmida
Articles created by Qbugbot